Hindol is a Hindustani classical raga from the Kalyan Thaat.

According to Indian classical vocalist Pandit Jasraj, Hindol is an ancient raga associated with the spring season and is sung during the first part of the day.

Origin 
The raga emerges from Kalyan Thaat. It is an ancient raga associated with the spring season.

Technical description

Arohana 
The Arohana has five notes.

Sa Ga Ma# Dha Ni Dha Sa.

Avarohana 
The Avarohana has five notes.

Sa Ni Dha Ma# Ga Sa.

Re and Pa are not used. The only Teevra note used is Ma (henceforth represented by Ma#). All other swaras are shuddha.

Pakad 
Sa Ga Ma# Dha Ni Dha Ma# Ga Sa.

The vadi swara is Dha, and the samvadi is Ga.

Jati 
Audhva – Audhav

Samay (time) 
The raga is to be sung or played on an instrument such as veena, sitar, sehnai, flute, etc., during the first part of the day.

Further information 
The raga has Teevra Madhyam at its heart, and revolves around that note, resting on Dha or Ga. A prominent movement in Hindol is the gamak, heavy and forceful oscillations particularly using Ma# and Dha. Its structure and phrasing is the imitation of a swing, hence the name Hindol (Hindola means swing). The Ni in the avarohana is very weak, and in most compositions, it is used obliquely or often entirely avoided. The mostly pure classical genre of music like Khayals or Dhamars are composed in this raga.

References

Sources 
 Sound of India, The Best Reference Site for Indian Classical Music
 The Raga Guide – Hindol
 

Hindustani ragas